Leucophlebia neumanni is a moth of the family Sphingidae. It is known from dry bush in southern and western Ethiopia and in northern Uganda.

The head and body are entirely rosy red. The forewings are pink with a yellow longitudinal streak. The hindwings are orange yellow. The mid and hind tibiae are creamy white.

References

Leucophlebia
Moths described in 1902
Insects of Uganda
Insects of Ethiopia
Moths of Africa